Millers is an unincorporated community in Carroll County, Maryland, United States. The Jacob F. Shaffer Farm was listed on the National Register of Historic Places in 1998.

References

According to the website www.mdihp.net from Survey CARR-1456, "When the Baltimore and Hanover Railroad passed through Aaron Miller's land, he built and ran the railroad stop, which came to be known as Millers Station, and sold off lots creating a small crossroads community that still bears his name (CARR-553).  When he (Aaron Miller) died in  early 1891, he was living at the station.

Unincorporated communities in Carroll County, Maryland
Unincorporated communities in Maryland